Panama is a 2022 action thriller film directed by Mark Neveldine and starring Cole Hauser and Mel Gibson.

This film lists 45 different producers in the beginning credits.

It was released in the United States on March 18, 2022 by Saban Films.

Plot
When the U.S. is on the brink of invading Panama, a former marine, Becker, is hired by a CIA operative, Stark, for a top secret arms trade mission. Alone and among the most dangerous arms dealers, Becker learns the true nature of political power.

Cast
 Cole Hauser as James Becker
 Mel Gibson as Stark
 Kate Katzman as Tatiana
 Charlie Weber as Hank Burns
 Victor Turpin as Brooklyn Rivera
 Mauricio Henao as Enrique Rodriguez
 Jackie Cruz as Cynthia Benitez

Production
The project was first announced in 2014 with Daniel Adams directing from a script he co-wrote with William Barber. In 2019, Morgan Freeman and Frank Grillo were attached to star in the film, with Adams still on board to direct. In 2020, it was announced that Mel Gibson and Cole Hauser will star in the film, with Mark Neveldine replacing Adams as director.

Principal photography commenced in December 2020 in Puerto Rico. The film was shot in 14 days over the course of 3 weeks.

Reception

Critical response

References

External links
 

2022 films
2022 action thriller films
American action thriller films
Cockfighting in film
Saban Films films
Films about arms trafficking
Films about the illegal drug trade
Films set in 1989
Films set in Honduras
Films set in Panama
Films set in Texas
Films shot in Puerto Rico
2020s English-language films
2020s American films